The non-marine molluscs of Myanmar are a part of the fauna of Myanmar (wildlife of Myanmar). A number of species of molluscs are found in the wild in Myanmar.

Freshwater gastropods 
Freshwater gastropods in Myanmar include:

Viviparidae
 Angulyagra oxytropis (Benson, 1836)
 Bellamya bengalensis (Lamarck, 1882)

Assimineidae
 Assiminea beddomeana Nevill, 1880
 Assiminea brevicula Pfeiffer, 1854
 Assiminea francesiae Wood, 1828
 Assiminea microsculpta Nevill, 1880

Bithyniidae
 Bithynia moreletiana Nevill, 1877
 Bithynia pulchella Benson, 1836
 Bithynia pygmaea Preston, 1908
 Bithynia siamensis Lea, 1856

Ellobiidae
 Auriculastra subula (Qouy & Gaimard, 1832) – in brackish waters

Pachychilidae
 Brotia pagodula (Gould, 1847)
 Faunus ater (Linnaeus, 1758)
 Sulcospira housei (I. Lea, 1856)

Lymnaeidae
 Austropeplea viridis (Quoy & Gaimard, 1832)

Land gastropods 
Land gastropods in Myanmar include:

Cyclophoridae
 Cyclophorus affinis Theobald, 1858
 Cyclophorus aurantiacus pernobilis Gould, 1844
 Cyclophorus expansus (Pfeiffer, 1853)
 Cyclophorus fulguratus Pfeiffer, 1852
 Cyclophorus haughtoni Theobald, 1858
 Cyclophorus speciosus (Philippi, 1847)
 Cyclophorus zebrinus (Benson, 1836)
 Scabrina basisulcata (E. von Martens, 1897)
 Scabrina calyx (Benson, 1856)
 Scabrina hispidula (W. T. Blanford, 1863)
 Scabrina inglisianus (Stoliczka, 1871)

Streptaxidae – 10 species of Streptaxidae are known from Myanmar
 Perrottetia
 Huttonella bicolor (Hutton, 1834)

Plectopylidae
 Chersaecia
 Endothyrella plectostoma (Benson, 1836)
 Hunyadiscus andersoni (W. Blanford, 1869)

Ariophantidae
 Hemiplecta humphreysiana
 Megaustenia siamense (Haines, 1858)
 Syama primiscua Godwin-Austen

Camaenidae
 Amphidromus atricallosus (Gould, 1843)
 Amphidromus lepidus (Gould, 1856)
 Amphidromus moniliferus (Gould, 1846)
 Amphidromus sinensis
 Amphidromus sinensis gracilis Fulton, 1896
 Amphidromus sinensis vicaria Fulton, 1896
 Amphidromus theobaldianus (Benson, 1857)

Freshwater bivalves
Freshwater bivalves in Myanmar include:

Unionidae
 Sinanodonta woodiana (Lea, 1834) – non-indigenous, firstly reported in 2017

Sphaeriidae
 Pisidium clarkeanum G. et H. Nevill, 1871
 Pisidium nevillianum Theobald, 1876

See also
 List of marine molluscs of Myanmar

Lists of molluscs of surrounding countries:
 List of non-marine molluscs of India
 List of non-marine molluscs of Bangladesh
 List of non-marine molluscs of China
 List of non-marine molluscs of Laos
 List of non-marine molluscs of Thailand

References

External links 
 May, J. T., Lat, L. H., Saw, B., Soe, S. W., & Tin, T. M. (2014). Regional prevalence study on trematodes' intermediate, host snails in Taunggyi and Ayetharyar Townships, Southern Shan State. In Proceedings of First International Conference and Annual Meeting of Myanmar Veterinary Association, 2–3 February 2014, Yangon, Myanmar. Livestock-Human-Environment Interface Challenge to Animals' Health and Livestock Production (pp. 150–159). Myanmar Veterinary Association. abstract

Molluscs
Myanmar